The Order, also known as The Sin Eater, is a 2003 mystery horror film written and directed by Brian Helgeland, starring Heath Ledger, Benno Fürmann, Mark Addy, and Shannyn Sossamon. Helgeland directed Ledger, Addy and Sossamon in the 2001 film A Knight's Tale. It was poorly received from critics and was a box office failure.

The film revolves around the investigation of the suspicious death of an excommunicated priest and the discovery of a Sin Eater headquartered in Rome.

Plot

The film's premise is that there is another way to heaven than adherence to the practices of the Roman Catholic Church. A secular Sin Eater can remove all taint of sin, no matter how foul, from the soul just before death. The purified soul can then ascend into heaven. The Roman Catholic Church, according to the film, considers this heresy.

Alex Bernier (Heath Ledger), is an unhappy and disillusioned priest and a member of the fictitious Carolingian order, which specializes in fighting demons and other hell-spawn. Father Dominic, the head of the Carolingians, has died in Rome under suspicious circumstances and Alex is sent by Cardinal Driscoll (Peter Weller), who is tipped to be the next Pope, to investigate. Mara Williams, an artist Alex once exorcised, comes to Alex at his church and says that she has a feeling that something terrible is going to happen to him. The police come looking for her, and tell Alex that Mara has escaped from a mental hospital. Alex lies and denies that he's seen her and it is revealed that Mara was in the hospital because she had tried to kill Alex during the exorcism. Mara goes to Rome with Alex after promising that she won't try to kill him again.

In Rome, Alex visits the morgue and sees strange markings on Dominic's corpse. He contacts Thomas Garrett, another Carolingian, who comes to Rome to help investigate Dominic's death. Alex comes across a book that explains the markings as being the sign of a Sin Eater's work. He heads to the Vatican, where an official tells him that Sin Eaters don't exist and that Dominic may not be buried on sacred ground because he had been excommunicated. Alex, moving ever farther from his vocation, defies his superiors and secretly reads a holy service over the body and buries Dominic in the Carolingian cemetery.

Driscoll arrives in Rome and gives Alex a special dagger. According to a fragment of parchment Alex and Thomas find among Dominic's books, the dagger is to be plunged into the Sin Eater while reciting a text in Aramaic. Alex and Thomas take these instructions to mean that the dagger and incantation will kill the Sin Eater and they begin hunting for the Sin Eater and the remainder of the parchment instructions.

Thomas leads Alex to a nightclub where they are taken to the underground base of operations of a masked man called Chirac, the 'Black Pope.' The Black Pope owes a favor to Thomas and Alex asks where to find the Sin Eater. The Black Pope then hangs three people and tells Alex to ask his question of the dying men who can see what the living cannot. One of the dying tells Alex a riddle that leads to a rendezvous with the Sin Eater. On the way out of the Black Pope's headquarters, demons attack and injure Thomas, but Alex saves him and gets him to a hospital.

Alex leaves Thomas in the hospital and meets the Sin Eater, William Eden, at St. Peter's Cathedral who explains that he has been a Sin Eater for centuries, taking over for an earlier Sin Eater (a Carolingian priest) who ate the sins of Eden's brother, who died during the construction of the cathedral. Eden is very charismatic and talks with Alex about the priest's desires, and Alex admits he wants Mara. He goes to her and they make love. After, Alex leaves Mara asleep and goes to Eden, who tells Alex that he is tired and ready to die and asks Alex to take his place. Alex has the dagger with him, but is curious and doesn't use it. He assists Eden with a sin eating ritual, but ultimately refuses Eden's offer because he has decided to leave the priesthood to be with Mara.

Eden visits Mara, slits her wrists to make it appear that she has committed suicide, and leaves her for Alex to find. Alex returns and finds Mara near death and beyond medical help. He quickly performs the sin-eating ritual so that she can go to Heaven. After absorbing Mara's sins, Alex sees that there is no sin of suicide on Mara's conscience and realizes Eden's deception. Alex goes after Eden to kill him.

Meanwhile, the injured Thomas is out of the hospital and goes to see the Black Pope, who is revealed to be Cardinal Driscoll. Driscoll shows Thomas the second half of the parchment, which horrifies him.  Driscoll prevents Thomas from leaving to warn Alex.

Alex cannot find Eden and returns to the Black Pope to learn where Eden is. The Black Pope (face hidden) again tells Alex to ask the dying. Alex recognizes that Thomas is the man being hanged, and frees him using a pistol. However, Thomas's throat is too injured by the noose to tell Alex the truth of the parchment.

Alex finds Eden and stabs him with the dagger while reciting the incantation, with Thomas arriving too late to stop him. Eden's powers are transferred to Alex, and Eden, happy to be free of his burden of the sins of others, dies. Thomas reveals that instead of being instructions on how to kill a Sin Eater, the parchment is actually instructions on how to become a Sin Eater. In the meantime, St. Peter's Basilica in Rome crumbles around them. The entirety of Alex's and Mara's lives have been a plot among Dominic, Eden and Driscoll to entrap Alex. Eden wants to die, Driscoll wants to be Pope and Dominic wanted the financial resources to pursue arcane knowledge.

Alex informs the church about Driscoll's activities and Driscoll is ruined. Driscoll then decides to kill himself and calls on the Sin Eater, now Alex, to remove his sins. Driscoll slits his wrists and when he is near death, Alex tells him that he knows that Eden and Driscoll caused Mara's death. Alex does not eat Driscoll's sins but forces them down Driscoll's throat.

The Sin Eater William Eden used his power to accumulate wealth. The Sin Eater Alex Bernier decides to act as a power for good, saving only those who deserve it and allowing evildoers to die in sin.

Cast
Heath Ledger as Alex Bernier
Shannyn Sossamon as Mara Williams
Benno Fürmann as William Eden
Mark Addy as Thomas Garrett
Peter Weller as Driscoll
Francesco Carnelutti as Dominic
Adam Toomer as Chuck Lowery

Reception

The film opened at #6 at the U.S. Box office raking in $4,438,899 USD in its first opening weekend. The film was panned by critics. It currently holds a 10% rating on Rotten Tomatoes based on 61 reviews.

References

External links
 
 

Full review by the U.S. Congress of Catholic Bishops

2003 films
2000s mystery films
2003 psychological thriller films
Aramaic-language films
English-language German films
German horror films
American mystery films
American supernatural thriller films
Religious horror films
20th Century Fox films
Films with screenplays by Brian Helgeland
Films directed by Brian Helgeland
2000s American films
2000s German films